Hypomolis agnes is a moth of the family Erebidae. It was described by Hervé de Toulgoët in 1982. It is found in Peru.

References

 

Arctiini
Moths described in 1982